In mathematics, symmetrization is a process that converts any function in  variables to a symmetric function in  variables.
Similarly, antisymmetrization converts any function in  variables into an antisymmetric function.

Two variables

Let  be a set and  be an additive abelian group. A map  is called a  if

It is called an  if instead 

The  of a map  is the map 

The sum of the symmetrization and the antisymmetrization of a map  is 
Thus, away from 2, meaning if 2 is invertible, such as for the real numbers, one can divide by 2 and express every function as a sum of a symmetric function and an anti-symmetric function.

The symmetrization of a symmetric map is its double, while the symmetrization of an alternating map is zero; similarly, the antisymmetrization of a symmetric map is zero, while the antisymmetrization of an anti-symmetric map is its double.

Bilinear forms

The symmetrization and antisymmetrization of a bilinear map are bilinear; thus away from 2, every bilinear form is a sum of a symmetric form and a skew-symmetric form, and there is no difference between a symmetric form and a quadratic form.

At 2, not every form can be decomposed into a symmetric form and a skew-symmetric form. For instance, over the integers, the associated symmetric form (over the rationals) may take half-integer values, while over  a function is skew-symmetric if and only if it is symmetric (as ). 

This leads to the notion of ε-quadratic forms and ε-symmetric forms.

Representation theory

In terms of representation theory:
 exchanging variables gives a representation of the symmetric group on the space of functions in two variables,
 the symmetric and antisymmetric functions are the subrepresentations corresponding to the trivial representation and the sign representation, and
 symmetrization and antisymmetrization map a function into these subrepresentations – if one divides by 2, these yield projection maps.

As the symmetric group of order two equals the cyclic group of order two, this corresponds to the discrete Fourier transform of order two.

n variables

More generally, given a function in  variables, one can symmetrize by taking the sum over all  permutations of the variables, or antisymmetrize by taking the sum over all  even permutations and subtracting the sum over all  odd permutations (except that when  the only permutation is even).

Here symmetrizing a symmetric function multiplies by  – thus if  is invertible, such as when working over a field of characteristic  or  then these yield projections when divided by 

In terms of representation theory, these only yield the subrepresentations corresponding to the trivial and sign representation, but for  there are others – see representation theory of the symmetric group and symmetric polynomials.

Bootstrapping

Given a function in  variables, one can obtain a symmetric function in  variables by taking the sum over -element subsets of the variables. In statistics, this is referred to as bootstrapping, and the associated statistics are called U-statistics.

See also

Notes

References 

 

Symmetric functions